BTV (formerly MBC Digital 4) is a Mauritian free-to-air television channel owned by the Mauritius Broadcasting Corporation. Its programming consists of Indian Hindi-language TV series and non-fictional shows from Zee TV, Star Plus, Colors TV, Sony TV, Sony SAB, &TV and Star Bharat.

Current broadcasts
 Anupamaa
 Bade Achhe Lagte Hain
 Bin Kuch Kahe
 Yeh Teri Galiyan
 Agniphera (TV series)
 Mere Sai - Shraddha Aur Saburi
 Kundali Bhagya
 RadhaKrishn
 Ishaaron Ishaaron Mein
 Bhakharwadi (TV series)
 Siddhi Vinayak
 Motu Patlu
 Naagin 2 
Dance Plus (season 5)
Siya Ke Ram
ViR: The Robot Boy

See also 
 Kids Channel (Mauritian TV channel)
 MBC 1 (Mauritian TV channel)
 MBC 2 (Mauritian TV channel)
 MBC 3 (Mauritian TV channel)
 List of programs broadcast by the Mauritius Broadcasting Corporation

References

External links
 Official Schedule,^ Official MBC Digital 4 Website.

Television channels in Mauritius
Mauritius Broadcasting Corporation